"Take a Load Off Your Feet" is a song by the American rock band the Beach Boys from their 1971 album Surf's Up. It was written by Al Jardine, Brian Wilson and Gary Winfrey.

Background and recording
Gary Winfrey returned to California, after serving in the Air Force, in 1968. He and Al Jardine quickly rekindled a friendship that had begun back when both were in high school. Winfrey's wife Sandi was pregnant at the time, and her ankles were swollen. With the song "Hair" being popular at the time, somebody suggested writing a similar song about ankles. That song turned into "Take a Load Off Your Feet". Brian Wilson would later add some lyrics and help with the melody. Conversely, Jardine said of the song in a 1976 interview,

The first session for the song was during the Add Some Music sessions in January 1970. The song was then put on hold until the early part of the next year. All of the sessions were held at Brian Wilson's home studio. Brian did the lead vocal on the first verse and the bridge, while Jardine sang the remaining verses. Brian, Al and Carl Wilson, with help from Winfrey, sang the backing vocals, and Brian added sound effects including hitting an empty 5-gallon Sparklett's glass water container with a rubber mallet for percussion, footsteps and the horn of his Rolls-Royce Phantom V.

Release
According to band manager Jack Rieley, Jardine "demanded" the song be included on the Surf's Up album, while Jardine said that the song appeared at Rieley's insistence. Jardine explained, "It's cute, but come on ... for some reason Jack Rieley liked it too and said, 'It's got to be on the album. That's definitely an ecology song.' 'Ecology? A song about your feet?' It's personal ecology."

A live version of the song, performed November 26, 1993 in New York City, appears on the band's 2021 box set Feel Flows. Prior to the box set's release, Jardine commented, "Wait until you hear the live version of 'Take a Load Off Your Feet'; it will blow your 'sandals' off! It is so damn good ... I almost fainted when I heard it. I didn't even remember performing it live. ... I've always hated the studio version of 'Take a Load Off Your Feet,' but now I LOVE it because of this live version. Isn't that funny?"

Reception
Biographer Timothy White writes that the song is "a slice of social commentary about rundown bodies as well as sullied beaches, its droll sound effects succeeding where a more heavy-handed scolding would not have done."

Personnel
Credits from Craig Slowinski

The Beach Boys
Al Jardine - lead and backing vocals, acoustic guitar
Brian Wilson - lead and backing vocals, Baldwin organ, bass guitar, floor tom w/ timpani mallet, water jug, tambourine, temple blocks, feet with sandals on asphalt roof, spoon on bowl, china plate, Rolls-Royce Phantom V
Carl Wilson - backing vocals

Guest
Gary Winfrey - backing vocals

Additional musicians
Michel Colombier - string arrangement
Sam Freed - violin
David Frisina - violin
Anatol Kaminsky - violin
Nathan Kaproff - violin
George Kast - violin

References

External links
 
 

1971 songs
The Beach Boys songs
Songs written by Brian Wilson
Songs written by Al Jardine
Song recordings produced by the Beach Boys